Shahla Ujayli (born 1976) is a Syrian writer. She studied modern Arabic literature at Aleppo University, eventually obtaining a doctorate. She became a teacher at her alma mater, and she also taught at the American University in Madaba, Jordan. She made her literary debut in 2005, publishing a short story collection called The Mashrabiyya. Since then, she has published three novels: The Cat's Eye (2006) (winner of the Jordan State Award for Literature), Persian Carpet (2013), and A Sky Close to Our House (2015). The last-named book has been nominated for the 2016 Arabic Booker Prize. Ujayli was also a participant at the 2014 IPAF nadwa, an annual writing workshop organized by the sponsors of the Arabic Booker for promising young writers.

Ujayli's academic works include: 
 Mirror of Strangeness: Articles on Cultural Criticism (2006)
 The Syrian Novel: Experimentalism and Theoretical Categories (2009)
 Cultural Particularity in the Arabic Novel (2011)

On January 12, 2016, her novel A Sky Close to Our House was picked as one of sixteen candidates for the International Prize for Arabic Fiction.

References

Syrian writers
1976 births
Living people